Béni Ounif District is a district in Béchar Province, Algeria.

References

Districts of Béchar Province